KMIA may refer to:

 Miami International Airport, in Miami, Florida, United States, its ICAO airport code
 Kruger Mpumalanga International Airport, near Nelspruit, South Africa
 KMIA (AM), a radio station (1210 AM) in Auburn, Washington, United States
 KBMB, a radio station (710 AM) licensed to Black Canyon City, Arizona, United States that held the call sign KMIA from 2003 to 2010